Tokyo Raiders is a 2000 Hong Kong action film set in Hong Kong and Tokyo, directed by Jingle Ma and starring Tony Leung Chiu-wai, Ekin Cheng and Kelly Chen. The success of the film led to the making of its sequel, Seoul Raiders, in 2005. Notably, the film was the last film to ever be released on LaserDisc, being released in September 2001.

Plot

Cast
 Tony Leung Chiu-wai as Detective Lam Kwai-yan
 Ekin Cheng as Pat Tai-yung
 Kelly Chen as Macy
 Cecilia Cheung as Saori
 Toru Nakamura as Takashashi Yuji
 Hiroshi Abe as Ito Takeshi
 Kumiko Endô as Naomi
 Maju Ozawa as Yukiko
 Yûko Moriyama as Miyuku
 Minami Shirakawa as Sayuri
 Takeshi Yamato as Akagawa
 Ko Shibasaki as Yumi

Reception
Derek Elley of Variety wrote that it "makes up in personality and an overall light, jokey tone what it lacks in sheer action smarts."  Time Out London wrote, "Made to order for Chinese New Year release, this charmless action-comedy would like to be Charade but hasn't a clue how to handle plot structure, characterisation or secret-identity twists."  Keith Phipps of The A.V. Club wrote that it "delivers the mix of humor, action, and style promised, though not delivered, by the big-screen version of Charlie's Angels". Beyond Hollywood wrote, "Aside from an overbearing soundtrack and a hackneyed plot with too many silly twists, Tokyo Raiders is good for a laugh."

References

External links
 
 
 Tokyo Raiders at LoveHKFilm.com

2000s Cantonese-language films
2000 films
2000s action comedy films
2000 martial arts films
Hong Kong action comedy films
Hong Kong detective films
Police detective films
2000s spy films
Hong Kong martial arts films
Golden Harvest films
Films directed by Jingle Ma
Films set in Tokyo
Films shot in Tokyo
Films with screenplays by Susan Chan
2000s Hong Kong films